Georgios Koletis was a Greek cyclist. He competed at the 1896 Summer Olympics in Athens, winning a silver medal.

Career
Koletis competed in the 10 and 100 kilometres races. He finished second in the 100 kilometres, behind Léon Flameng of France. Koletis and Flameng were the only two to finish. When Flameng crossed the finish line, Koletis had completed 289 of the 300 laps required. In the 10 kilometres race, Koletis quit after 7 kilometres due to injuries sustained by colliding with countryman Aristidis Konstantinidis two-thirds of the way through the race.

References

External links

Year of birth missing
Year of death missing
Greek male cyclists
Greek track cyclists
Cyclists at the 1896 Summer Olympics
19th-century sportsmen
Olympic cyclists of Greece
Olympic silver medalists for Greece
Place of birth missing
Olympic medalists in cycling
Medalists at the 1896 Summer Olympics
Place of death missing
19th-century Greek people